Forestry in Taiwan was historically a significant industry. The logging of most of Taiwan's old growth forest has led to the sunset of the industry with remaining stands protected by law. Illegal logging remains a significant threat, especially to the oldest and most valuable trees.

History
Major commercial forestry in Taiwan began during the Japanese colonial period with most forestry products being shipped back to Japan.

Due to the remoteness and inaccessibility of many regions some of Taiwan's large trees survived, in 2022 a team of researchers identified 941 trees taller than 65m.

Camphor
Camphor has been produced as a forest product for centuries, condensed from the vapor given off by the roasting of wood chips cut from the relevant trees, and later by passing steam through the pulverized wood and condensing the vapors. By the early 19th century most camphor tree reserves had been depleted with the remaining large stands in Japan and Taiwan with Taiwanese production greatly exceeding Japanese. Camphor was one of the primary resources extracted by Taiwan's colonial powers as well as one of the most lucrative. First the Chinese and then the Japanese established monopolies on Taiwanese camphor. In 1868 a British naval force sailed into Anping harbor and the local British representative demanded the end of the Chinese camphor monopoly, after the local Qing representative refused the British bombarded the town and took the harbor. The "camphor regulations” negotiated between the two sides subsequently saw a brief end to the camphor monopoly. When its use in the nascent chemical industries greatly increased the volume of demand in the late 19th century, potential for changes in supply and in price followed. In 1911 Robert Kennedy Duncan, an industrial chemist and educator, related that the Imperial Japanese government had recently (1907–1908) tried to monopolize the production of natural camphor as a forest product in Asia but that the monopoly was prevented by the development of the total synthesis alternatives,

Taiwan acacia
Taiwan acacia (Acacia confusa), also known as Formosan koa and Asian walnut, is a hardwood species native to Taiwan. It is challenging to work and for this reason was traditionally burned as firewood or turned into charcoal. In later years it was exported to China to be made into wood flooring for the American market. At its height Taiwan exported more than 1,000 containers of Taiwan acacia to China. More recently it has been used domestically to produce high value wood products like musical instruments, furniture, and bathtubs.

Illegal logging
Illegal logger are known as shan laoshu, mountain rats, in Taiwan. Illegal logging is a major issue in Taiwan with significant revenue derived from the activity by organized crime and downstream industries. Most illegal loggers are foreign laborers recruited by Taiwanese bosses, often they don't even know they are participating in an illegal activity.

In 2020 the Forestry Bureau greatly increased the maximum fines for illegal logging.

Deforestation

Deforestation in Taiwan is the changes on the forested area in the island due to economy factors, such as agriculture, urban expansion etc. In 1904–2015, Taiwan has a net annual forest area change rate of 34 km2.

See also
 Taiwan Forestry Research Institute
 Dongshi Forestry Culture Park
 Luodong Forestry Culture Park
 Lintianshan Forestry Culture Park

References